Isopropylamine (monoisopropyl amine, MIPA, 2-Propylamine) is an organic compound, an amine.  It is a hygroscopic colorless liquid with ammonia-like odor. It is miscible with water and flammable.  It is a valuable intermediate in chemical industry.

Reactions
Isopropylamine exhibits reactions typical of other simple alkyl amines, i.e. protonation, alkylation, acylation, condensation with carbonyls.
Like other simple aliphatic amines, isopropylamine is a weak base: the pKa of [(CH3)2)CHNH3]+ is 10.63.

Preparation and use
Isopropylamine can be obtained by reaction of isopropyl alcohol with ammonia in presence of a catalyst:
(CH3)2CHOH + NH3 → (CH3)2CHNH2 + H2O

Isopropylamine is a building block for the preparation of many herbicides and pesticides including atrazine, bentazon, glyphosate, imazapyr, ametryne, desmetryn, prometryn, pramitol, dipropetryn, propazine, fenamiphos, and iprodione. It is  a regulating agent for plastics, intermediate in organic synthesis of coating materials, plastics, pesticides, rubber chemicals, pharmaceuticals and others, and as an additive in the petroleum industry.

References

External links

Alkylamines
Isopropylamino compounds